François Laverne (23 May 1907 – 28 December 1988) was a French sailor. He competed in the 6 Metre event at the 1948 Summer Olympics.

References

External links
 

1907 births
1988 deaths
French male sailors (sport)
Olympic sailors of France
Sailors at the 1948 Summer Olympics – 6 Metre
Sportspeople from Paris